The European Union Co-ordinating Office for Palestinian Police Support (EUPOL COPPS), is a European Union Common Security and Defence Policy (CSDP) mission for the Palestinian territories, based and operational in the West Bank. It is part of the wider efforts of the European Union in support of Palestinian state building in the context of working towards a comprehensive peace based on a two-State solution. It is one of two civilian missions the EU runs in the Palestinian territories, the other being the European Union Border Assistance Mission Rafah (EU BAM Rafah).

EUPOL COPPS has its headquarters in Ramallah, and its objective is to assist the Palestinian Authority in building the institutions of a future State of Palestine in the areas of policing and criminal justice under Palestinian ownership and in accordance with the best international standards. The support of the EU aims at increasing the safety and security of the Palestinian population and at serving the domestic agenda of the Palestinian Authority in reinforcing the rule of law. EUPOL COPPS acts also as a key channel for the efforts of the EU and the wider international community, in its area of responsibility, to improve the situation on the ground and obtain practical results.

Establishment
EUPOL COPPS was established following an EU Council decision in November 2005, and builds on the work of the EU Co-ordination Office for Palestinian Police Support (EU COPPS), which was established in January 2005 within the office of the EU Special Representative for the Middle East Peace Process, Ambassador Marc Otte. The initiative followed the expression by EU leaders in June 2004 of their readiness to support the Palestinian Authority in taking responsibility for law and order, and in particular, in improving its Palestinian Civil Police Force and law enforcement capacity.

Organisational structure
EUPOL COPPS is composed of 114 unarmed members of staff, 69 of whom are internationals and 45 locals. Most of the staff are secondees from EU member states. EUPOL COPPS has three operational pillars: a Police Advisory, a Rule of Law and a Programme and Evaluation Department. All sections are composed of experienced police officers, magistrates and experts from EU Member States and non EU contributing countries, such as Canada or Norway. Close cooperation between the sections takes place through various thematic groups.

The current Head of Mission is M. Rodolphe Mauget, who succeeded,  Kenneth Deane, Henrik Malmquist and Paul Robert Kernaghan. The first Head of Mission was Jonathan McIvor. The Head of Mission receives guidance from EU High Representative for the Common Foreign and Security Policy through the EU Special Representative for the Middle East Peace Process.

References

External links
 http://www.eupolcopps.eu
 http://www.consilium.europa.eu/eeas/security-defence/eu-operations/eupol-copps?lang=en

Palestine
Law enforcement in the State of Palestine
State of Palestine–European Union relations